Horton Guyford Stever (October 24, 1916 – April 9, 2010) was an American administrator, physicist, educator, and engineer. He was a director of the National Science Foundation (from February 1972 to August 1976).

Biography
Stever was raised in Corning, New York, principally by his maternal grandmother. He played football in high school. He graduated from Colgate University with an undergraduate degree in physics and then from California Institute of Technology in 1941 with a PhD in physics. He joined the staff of the radiation lab at MIT. In 1942 he began serving the military as a civilian scientific liaison officer based in London, England until the end of World War II. After D-Day he was sent to France several times to study German technology.

He returned to MIT after the war, serving as associate dean of engineering there from 1956 to 1959 and then as a department head. In 1965 he became the fifth President of Carnegie Mellon University (and the first under that name, in 1967), a position he held until 1972.  Stever House, a dorm on Carnegie Mellon's campus is named for him. During this period, he was also chairman of the aeronautics and space engineering board for the National Academy of Engineering advising NASA and other Federal agencies.

He also served as the director of the National Science Foundation from 1972 until 1976. Between 1976 and 1977 he was President Gerald Ford's Science Advisor.

He also served on the board of trustees of Science Service, now known as Society for Science & the Public, from 1982 to 2006.

Stever received an LL.D. from Bates College in 1977.  In 1997, he received the Vannevar Bush Award from the National Science Board.

Stever died at his home in Gaithersburg, Maryland on April 9, 2010.

NACA Special Committee on Space Technology
Guyford Stever was chairman or member of numerous advisory committees to the U.S. government. The NACA's Special Committee on Space Technology, also called the "Stever Committee," was among the better-known of these.  It was a special steering committee that was formed with the mandate to coordinate various branches of the Federal government, private companies as well as universities within the United States with NACA's objectives and also harness their expertise in order to develop a space program.  

Remarkably, Hendrik Wade Bode, the man who helped develop the robot weapons that brought down the Nazi V-1 flying bombs over London during WWII, was actually serving on the same committee and sitting at the same table as the chief engineer of the V-2, the other weapon that terrorised London: Wernher von Braun.
 
As of their meeting on May 26, 1958, committee members, starting clockwise from the left of the adjacent picture, included:

NRC Committee on Human Exploration of Space 
In 1990 Stever chaired a Committee on Human Exploration of Space for the National Research Council. The committee released a report titled, Human Exploration of Space: A Review of NASA's 90-Day Study and Alternatives.

Honors 

 Elected to the American Academy of Arts and Sciences, 1953.
 Elected to the American Philosophical Society, 2001.

References

H. Guyford Stever Oral History from IEEE via the Engineering and Technology History Wiki
Announcement of his death

Footnotes

|-

|-

1916 births
2010 deaths
American physicists
California Institute of Technology alumni
Colgate University alumni
Chief Scientists of the United States Air Force
Engineers from New York (state)
Ford administration personnel
Members of the United States National Academy of Sciences
NASA people
National Medal of Science laureates
National Advisory Committee for Aeronautics
Nixon administration personnel
People from Corning, New York
Presidents of Carnegie Mellon University
Scientists from New York (state)
Vannevar Bush Award recipients
Members of the American Philosophical Society
Directors of the Office of Science and Technology Policy